Minigir, which means "tongues", may be:

 Lungalunga language
 Bilur language